Nitrite dismutase (Prolixin S, Nitrophorin 7) is an enzyme with systematic name nitrite:nitrite oxidoreductase. This enzyme catalyses the following chemical reaction

 3 nitrite + 2 H+  2 nitric oxide + nitrate + H2O

Nitrite dismutase contains ferriheme b.

References

External links 
 

EC 1.7.6